Floyd Roland Lamb (September 3, 1914 – June 2, 2002) was an American politician and a Democratic member of the Nevada Senate from 1956 to 1983. From 1946 to 1956, Lamb joined the Lincoln County Commission until he was elected to the senate.

In 1956, Lamb represented Lincoln County and in 1965 Lamb moved to Las Vegas where he represented Clark County and served as Chairman of the Senate Finance Committee until 1983.

Legacy
In 1977, Lamb convinced the Nevada Legislature to acquire Tule Springs Park from the then financially troubled city of Las Vegas and the park was later renamed Floyd Lamb Park.

Also, Lamb Boulevard in Las Vegas is named after him and/or his brother, Ralph Lamb, a former Clark County Sheriff who served from 1961 to 1979.

Conviction
Lamb and other Nevada politicians were forced to resign after they were convicted in 1983 for taking a $23,000 bribe in an FBI sting operation (Operation Yobo). Lamb spent 9 months in prison, then he was paroled and his civil rights were restored by the state Pardons Board.

See also
 Ralph Lamb, Floyd's younger brother and former Sheriff of Clark County.

References

External links
 

1914 births
2002 deaths
20th-century American politicians
American politicians convicted of bribery
Democratic Party Nevada state senators
People from Lincoln County, Nevada
Politicians from Las Vegas